Amarjeet Singh Nagi (born ) is an Indian male  track cyclist. He competed in the team sprint event at the 2012 and 2013 UCI Track Cycling World Championships.

References

External links
 Profile at cyclingarchives.com

1993 births
Living people
Indian track cyclists
Indian male cyclists
Place of birth missing (living people)
Cyclists at the 2014 Asian Games
Asian Games competitors for India